Carl George "Buddy" Boone (September 11, 1932 — September 1, 1986)  was a Canadian professional ice hockey right winger who played 34 regular season and 22 playoff games in the National Hockey League for the Boston Bruins between 1957 and 1958. Boone played most of his career, which lasted from 1952 to 1970, in the various professional ice hockey leagues of North America.

Career statistics

Regular season and playoffs

Awards and achievements
 WHL First All-Star Team (1963)
 WHL Second All-Star Team (1964)

External links

1932 births
1986 deaths
Boston Bruins players
Canadian ice hockey forwards
Des Moines Oak Leafs players
Edmonton Flyers (WHL) players
Ice hockey people from Ontario
Kingston Frontenacs (EPHL) players
Los Angeles Blades (WHL) players
Quebec Aces (QSHL) players
Providence Reds players
San Francisco Seals (ice hockey) players
St. Catharines Teepees players
St. Louis Flyers players
Springfield Indians players
Sportspeople from Kirkland Lake
Vancouver Canucks (WHL) players
Winnipeg Warriors (minor pro) players